Ypsolopha lucella is a moth of the family Ypsolophidae. It is found in Europe and Near East.

The moth flies from June to September depending on the location.

The larvae feed on oaks.

External links
 waarneming.nl 
 Lepidoptera of Belgium

Ypsolophidae
Moths of Europe
Moths of Asia